Dawlish railway station is on the Exeter to Plymouth line and serves the town of Dawlish in Devon, England.

The station is built on the sea wall, as is the railway line, and has often suffered from storm damage due its proximity to the sea. South of the station, the line passes through five tunnels through the cliffs as it follows the coast.

History

The station was opened by the South Devon Railway on 30 May 1846. The wall with bricked up windows that can be seen in the car park is the remains of the engine house that used to power the trains while they were worked by atmospheric power from 13 September 1847 until 9 September 1848. At this time it was one of Isambard Kingdom Brunel's  broad gauge railways.

The station initially had just one platform on the landward side with a loop line closer to the sea, but a second platform was added to serve the loop line on 1 May 1858. The original wooden station and train shed was burnt down on 14 August 1873.  The South Devon Railway built a new station with the platforms connected by an iron bridge, roofed with glass. The principal buildings were constructed adjoining Station Road, and the booking office was fitted with pitch pine cornice and fittings. Star gas pendent lights were installed, and a lift for taking up luggage to the platform levels. The first-class waiting rooms were furnished with Brussels carpets and polished oak furniture. The contractor was Blatchford and Son of Tavistock and the cost was £4,000. The new station was opened on 12 April 1875.

An unusual feature of the section of line running towards Teignmouth was the sudden 'dip' in the track that once existed, resulting from the demand by a local resident who did not wish to lose his view of the sea.

The South Devon Railway was amalgamated into the Great Western Railway on 1 February 1876, and on 20 May 1892 the line was converted to  standard gauge.  The Great Western in turn was nationalised into British Railways on 1 January 1948.

The platforms have been extended several times to cope with the crowds and now nearly reach Coastguards' Footbridge, although the Exeter platform was shortened again in 1970. The decorative iron and glass canopies above the platforms were replaced by concrete beams and glass panels in 1961 but the glass has since been replaced by Perspex. Goods traffic was withdrawn on 17 May 1965.

After a major storm in 2014 washed out the track bed and made an  breach in the sea wall north of the station, plans were developed to reinforce and replace the sea wall around the station area. This work, which was expected to cost £80 million, started in 2020 and was largely completed in late summer 2022. During this time the sea wall walkway was raised to platform level and both platforms were resurfaced. The platform lighting was improved and an accessible lift will be constructed following completion of the sea wall works to replace the rail-level crossing.

Signal boxes

The first signal box was provided on the seaward platform beside the north end of the waiting room but this was replaced by a new two-storey signal box on 9 September 1920 on the opposite platform.  So as to fit on the narrow platform the brick-built lower storey which contained the interlocking equipment was narrower than usual, with the upper storey was vaulted out from this to give a full size operating floor.

After the summer of 1970 the signal box was only opened on summer weekends or if there were problems working along the sea wall. It finally closed on 27 September 1986 since when the trains have been controlled from Exeter. Despite attempts to find a commercial use for the redundant building, it remained empty until 2013 when it was demolished during the period 2–5 July.

1921 accident
The passenger train, hauled by Star Class 4055 Princess Sophia, failed to stop at a danger signal. Cranes cleared the line by lifting damaged wagons onto the beach, where they remained for a couple of days.

Station masters

Francis Farr Fowler 1859 - 1862
Mr. Endle 1862 - 1863
Mr. Quigley 1863 - 1864
Joseph Pearse 1864 - 1866
Mr. Mills ???? - 1869
George E. Bray 1869 - 1878
Henry Ewart Williams 1879 - 1889
Stephen A. Hunt 1889 - 1895
W. A. Harrison 1895 - 1896
Richard D. Pressick 1896 -1909
Harry Jennings Gibson 1909 - 1927
W. A. Price 1927 - 1935
H. J. Vowles 1935 - ???? (formerly station master at Bovey Tracey)
G. Mitchell ca. 1949

Location

The station is adjacent to the beach near the gardens at the centre of the town. The station buildings are Grade II listed. The main frontage is in banded rusticated masonry. The remaining walls are rendered except for the east elevation, which faces the sea, which is in rubble stone.The station buildings are Grade II listed. It has two storeys as the railway runs above street level and a café occupies most of the street frontage. The main entrance is at road level on the side served by trains to Exeter. This opens onto a booking office with an ornate ceiling from where a flight of stairs lead up to the Exeter platform, but step-free access can be obtained through a gate from the car park beside the station buildings, which is the only access route when the booking office is closed.

Access to the opposite platform is by way of a covered footbridge, the stairways of which are contained within the building. Passengers who cannot use the steps can be escorted across the barrow crossing at the south end of the station by the station staff.

Immediately to the south of the station is the low Colonnade Viaduct, which carries the railway above the small river that runs through the gardens and the main footpath from the town to the beach and the South West Coast Path. To the north of the station is Coastguards Footbridge, with Coastguards Cottage, now a café, on the hill above the line to the west, and Brunel's Boat House between the line and the beach to the east.

Services

The revised timetable from 15 December 2019 has two or three Great Western Railway trains per hour calling at Dawlish in each direction. The line from Exeter St Davids through Dawlish to Paignton is marketed as the "Riviera Line".

At other times passengers travelling east or north catch a local train and change into main line trains at Exeter St Davids, or at Newton Abbot if travelling westwards.

Cultural References 
Simon Jenkins included in his 2017 book of the best 100 stations in Britain.

Notes

References

Further reading

Railway stations in Devon
Railway stations in Great Britain opened in 1846
Former Great Western Railway stations
Railway stations on the South West Coast Path
Railway stations served by CrossCountry
Railway stations served by Great Western Railway
1846 establishments in England
Grade II listed buildings in Devon
Grade II listed railway stations
Dawlish
DfT Category D stations